Karen Madoyan (born 1995) is a Bulgarian footballer of Armenian origin who plays as a midfielder for Chernomorets Balchik.

Career
Karen made his full first team league début in a 1–2 home defeat against Lokomotiv Plovdiv on 26 May 2015.

Career statistics

References

1995 births
Living people
Bulgarian footballers
Association football midfielders
PFC Cherno More Varna players
FC Chernomorets Balchik players
First Professional Football League (Bulgaria) players
Bulgarian people of Armenian descent